Bent Out of Shape is the seventh studio album released by English hard rock band Rainbow. It was originally released in September 1983 as an LP and cassette. The cassette featured several longer edits compared to the vinyl version. It was recorded at Sweet Silence Studios in Copenhagen in about 7 weeks.

History
Bent Out of Shape would be Rainbow's final studio album before their twelve-year hiatus from the studio. It also proved to be the band's final studio album with vocalist Joe Lynn Turner, bassist Roger Glover and keyboardist David Rosenthal, and their only one to feature drummer Chuck Burgi, who replaced Bobby Rondinelli just prior to the album's recording sessions.

The instrumental "Snowman" is based upon "Walking in the Air", a song written by Howard Blake for the 1982 animated film The Snowman based on Raymond Briggs' 1978 children's book of the same name.

Release and legacy
The album's cover was designed by Hipgnosis, and alongside Led Zeppelin's Coda, the artwork was amongst the last to be created by the studio before disbanding in 1983.

This album is generally referred to by critics and fans as a commercial effort, with the band attempting to repeat the success of the song  "Stone Cold" and the album Straight Between the Eyes. As a result, some of the songs, like the first single released from this album, "Street of Dreams", are usually considered to be more in the album-oriented rock style, instead of the hard rock sound of earlier Rainbow albums. The album was particularly aimed at the US market: the title is an American idiom rather than a British one. However, the album received positive reviews in the U.K. Howard Johnson of Kerrang! magazine (No.51 – Sept 22-Oct 5, 1983) praised the album as "possibly Rainbow's most complete work to date" and called "Desperate Heart" and "Street of Dreams" "two of this year's finest tunes".

In 1984, "Anybody There" was nominated for a Grammy Award for Best Rock Instrumental Performance.

A remastered CD reissue was released in May 1999, which restored the artwork of the original release. This has two tracks of a longer duration than on the first US CD issue.

The song "Street of Dreams" has been re-recorded in two versions by Blackmore's Night in 2006 for their fifth studio album, The Village Lanterne. The version featured on a regular album was sung by Candice Night. The other version, a bonus track on a special edition of the album, was performed in a duet by Night and Turner.

Promotion
The music video for "Can't Let You Go", directed by Dominic Orlando, was filmed in New York City (1984) and inspired by the 1920 silent b/w film The Cabinet of Dr. Caligari. Along with "Street of Dreams", directed by Storm Thorgerson, it became a part of Rainbow's home video collection The Final Cut (1985). The music video for "Street of Dreams" was banned by MTV for its supposedly controversial hypnotic clip.

Track listing

The LP has "Desperate Heart" at 4:00, whilst cassette and remastered CD have this track at 4:36, repeating the verse after the guitar solo. Similarly, "Make Your Move" is 3:56 on the LP, yet 5:25 on cassette and remastered CD, due to a reprise of a bridge section and a much longer playout. The first US CD edition (Polydor - 815 305-2) uses the LP version.

Personnel 
Rainbow
 Ritchie Blackmore - guitar
 Roger Glover - bass, percussion, producer
 Joe Lynn Turner - vocals
 David Rosenthal - keyboard
 Chuck Burgi - drums

Production
Flemming Rasmussen - engineer
Thomas Breckling - assistant engineer
Nick Blagona - mixing at BearTracks Studios, New York
Greg Calbi - mastering at Sterling Sound, New York

Singles 
 1983 - "Street of Dreams"/"Anybody There"
 1983 - "Street of Dreams"/"Anybody There"/"Power" (live) - 12" release
 1983 - "Can't Let You Go"/"All Night Long" (live)
 1983 - "Can't Let You Go"/"All Night Long" (live)/"Stranded" (live) - 12" release
 1983 - "Can't Let You Go"/"Drinking with the Devil" - Spain

Charts 
 

Album

Singles

References

Rainbow (rock band) albums
1983 albums
Albums produced by Roger Glover
Polydor Records albums
Albums with cover art by Storm Thorgerson
Albums with cover art by Hipgnosis